Assam Medical College and Hospital (AMCH), formerly Berry White Medical School, is a public medical school and hospital in Dibrugarh, Assam, India. It was the first medical college in Assam and whole Northeastern India. It is the tertiary medical referral centre for upper Assam and areas in neighbouring states, including Arunachal Pradesh.The college has been ranked 62 in the list of government institutes.it has been rated AAA+ by the Medical Council of India with a score of 273.5.

The  college offers numerous facilities including indoor and outdoor sports facilities, canteens, ATMs, etc. The academic facilities include laboratories, libraries, wifi across the campus providing access to the internet facilities through PCs and laptops.

The college offers admission to 200 students each year from 2019. Before 2019 it offered admission to 170 students each year.

History

The college was founded as Berry White Medical School in 1900 using a large donation from Sir John Berry White. It was renamed as Assam Medical College and Hospital on 3rd November, 1947. 3rd November is celebrated as foundation day every year by  students of the college. The Assam government has preserved the original Berry White Medical School building in Grahambazar, Dibrugarh. In 1910 the college imported two X-ray machines from England, which were the first in India, and opened the country's first radiology department.

On 12 February 2016, Union minister of health and family welfare laid the foundation of 192 bed super-special hospital with a 60-bed intensive care unit, a catheterization lab, and specialties in neurology, neurosurgery, cardiothoracic vascular surgery, nephrology and paediatrics.

Courses 
The college provides undergraduate and post-graduate education in:

 Community Medicine
 Medicine
 Nursing
 Midwifery
 Pharmacy
 Orthopaedics
 Cardiology
 Otorhinolaryngology
 General surgery
 Anatomy
 Pathology
 Biochemistry
 Ophthalmology
 Pediatrics
 Microbiology
 Obstetrics and Gynaecology
 Psychiatry
 Dentistry
 Neurology
 Pharmacology
 Forensics
 Anesthesiology
 Dermatology
 Plastic Surgery
 Radiology
 Physiotherapy

Patient care
It runs outpatient departments in general medicine, general surgery, orthopaedics, ophthalmology, ENT, head & neck surgery, dermatology, pulmonary medicine, geriatric medicine, obstetrics and gynaecology, dentistry, paediatrics, physiotherapy and psychiatry. Special outpatient departments for rheumatology, diabetes, neurology, nephrology, cardiothoracic and vascular surgery, plastic surgery, paediatric surgery, urology, cardiology, neurosurgery runs on specified days of week. Emergency services runs in casualty, paediatric medicine, obstetrics and psychiatry.

Notable alumni
Talimeren Ao
Rathin Datta
Upendra Devkota
Jitendra Nath Gohain
T.M. Lotha
Ashis Roy

References

External links
Official Website
College Dunia

Affiliates of Srimanta Sankaradeva University of Health Sciences
Medical colleges in Assam
Dibrugarh
Educational institutions established in 1947
1947 establishments in India
Colleges in Assam